The following are the national records in athletics in New Zealand. Those maintained by New Zealand's national athletics federation, Athletics New Zealand (ANZ), are the official records. This list also includes those listed by the IAAF but not recognised by ANZ as well as the best performances from lists maintained by other individuals and organisations.

Outdoor

Key to tables:

+ = en route to a longer distance

h = hand timing

A = affected by altitude

NWI = no wind information

OT = oversized track (> 200m in circumference)

Men

Women

Indoor

Men

Women

Notes
General
New Zealand Athletics Records 14 February 2023 updated
Specific

References

External links
ANZ web site
Association of Road Racing Statisticians – National Records

New Zealand
Records
Athletics
Athletics